NGC 2014 is a red emission nebula surrounding an open cluster of stars in the Large Magellanic Cloud, at a distance of about 163,000 light-years.

The nebula was discovered on 3 August 1826 by James Dunlop. Together with NGC 2020 it makes up what is called the Cosmic Reef.

References

External links 
 

Emission nebulae
Large Magellanic Cloud
Dorado (constellation)
2014